was a Japanese film director.

Filmography

References

External links

1906 births
1997 deaths
Japanese film directors
People from Nagano Prefecture